The following lists events that happened during 2015 in Liberia.

Incumbents
 President: Ellen Johnson Sirleaf
 Vice President: Joseph Boakai
 Chief Justice: Francis S. Korkpor, Sr.

Events

February
 February 20 - Liberia lifts curfews and reopens borders from Sunday as the Ebola epidemic begins to end.

March 
 March 5 - Liberia's last known ebola patient is discharged from a treatment center in Monrovia.

May 
 May 9 - The World Health Organization declares that the outbreak of the Ebola virus has ceased in Liberia after weeks of no cases.

Deaths
January 21 - Johnnie Lewis, Liberian lawyer and politician; 18th Chief Justice of Liberia (b. 1946)
July 20 - Kafumba Konneh, Liberian Muslim cleric and member of the Truth and Reconciliation Commission of Liberia

References

 
Years of the 21st century in Liberia
2010s in Liberia
Liberia
Liberia